The comparison of the performances of all the clubs that participated in the AFC Champions League is presented below. The qualifying rounds are not taken into account.

Classification

Performance

See also
 AFC Champions League
 Asian Club Championship and AFC Champions League records and statistics
 UEFA Champions League clubs performance comparison

Notes

References

Association football comparisons
AFC Champions League records and statistics